The 20915/20916 Indore - Lingampalli Humsafar Express is a superfast express train of the Indian Railways connecting  in Madhya Pradesh and  in Telangana. It is currently being operated with 20915/20916 train numbers on a weekly basis.

Coach Composition 

The train is completely 3-tier AC sleeper designed by Indian Railways with features of LED screen display to show information about stations, train speed etc. and will have announcement system as well, Vending machines for tea, coffee and milk, Bio toilets in compartments as well as CCTV cameras.

Service

The 20915/Lingampalli - Indore Humsafar Express has an average speed of 54 km/hr and covers 1539 km in 28 hrs 15 mins.

The 20916/Indore - Lingampalli Humsafar Express has an average speed of 51 km/hr and covers 1539 km in 30 hrs 15 mins.

Route & Halts

Schedule

Rake Sharing 

The train shares its rake with 20917/20918 Indore - Puri Humsafar Express.

Traction

Both trains are hauled by a Vadodara-based WAP-5 / WAP-7 locomotive on its entire journey.

See also
 Humsafar Express

References

External links 
 Lingampalli - Indore Humsafar Express
 19316/Indore - Lingampalli Humsafar Express

Humsafar Express trains
Transport in Indore
Transport in Hyderabad, India
Rail transport in Madhya Pradesh
Rail transport in Telangana
Rail transport in Maharashtra
Rail transport in Karnataka
Railway services introduced in 2018